Clepticus is a genus of wrasses native to the Atlantic Ocean.

Species
The currently recognized species in this genus are:
 Clepticus africanus Heiser, R. L. Moura & D. R. Robertson, 2000 (African creole wrasse)
 Clepticus brasiliensis Heiser, R. L. Moura & D. R. Robertson, 2000 (Brazilian creole wrasse)
 Clepticus parrae (Bloch & J. G. Schneider, 1801) (creole wrasse)

References

Labridae
Marine fish genera
Taxa named by Georges Cuvier